The American Friends of the Middle East (AFME) was an American international educational organization, formed in 1951. It was founded by columnist Dorothy Thompson, Kermit Roosevelt, Jr., Harry Emerson Fosdick, and 24 other American educators, theologians, and writers. The predecessor organization, with many of the same founders was the Committee for Justice and Peace in the Holy Land. The AFME organization was later linked to the Central Intelligence Agency (CIA). It existed as a pro-Arabist organization often critical of U.S. support for Israel.

History 
In 1948, Virginia Gildersleeve, Kermit Roosevelt, Harry Fosdick, and others had founded a similarly oriented Committee for Justice and Peace in the Holy Land, which was subsumed into the new organization.

Kermit Roosevelt, Jr. served as executive secretary of the AFME group of intellectuals and spokespersons for a time. In appealing for funds form American supporters “free from political pressure and racial and religious discrimination,” the AFME is reported to have stated that “most Americans… never had an accurate picture of Middle East.” The organization was active during the Cold War, and worked to place gifted international students in American universities. The mission of the organization was to "foster a nurturing connection" and "promote mutual understanding" between cultures. The group believed peace could happen through education and building human relationships. While students were living in the U.S., the AFME attempted to improve their experience with the establishment of student groups on campuses, and they had four key groups including the Organization of Arab Students, the Confederation of Iranian Students, and groups for Pakistani and Afghani students.

In 1952, the AFME co-founded (alongside the Iranian embassy) the Confederation of Iranian Students group. The first Iranian student organization was based at Lafayette College, under the supervision of Reverend Charles R. Hulac. In 1953, the AFMA opened up an office in Tehran in order to place Iranian students in "proper Protestant colleges and universities" in the United States, during a period of the Abadan Crisis. Hulac and his organization had ties to the earlier Protestant missionary work done in Iran.

CIA involvement 
In 1967, Ramparts magazine disclosed a relationship between AFME and the CIA. Historians R.M. Miller, Hugh Wilford, and others have argued that from its early years, AFME was a part of an Arabist propaganda effort within the U.S., "secretly funded and to some extent managed" by the CIA, with further funding from the oil consortium Aramco. Anecdotal and first-hand accounts referenced by historians, in the absence of declassified intelligence documentation, have suggested that the American intelligence community used the AFME partially as a vehicle for establishing its intelligence network in the Middle East after World War II.

Critical response 
The Jewish Telegraphic Agency, a Jewish news agency, noted that the organization "does not include a single Jew among its charter members, but has among them numerous outspoken Anti-Zionists," and reported on a full page ad taken by the new organization in "the New York press" on June 27, 1951, reiterating its advertised purposes as follows:
1. “To break through the curtain of obscurity and distortion by writing and publicizing material designed to broaden understanding in the United States of Middle Eastern peoples, their problems, and progress.
2. “To send representatives to the different countries; to pay particular attention to the various religious; to enable them to state their problems, and to assist them in having their voice heard in America.
3. “To bring spokesmen of Eastern religious and cultural groups to this country to meet American audiences in person.
4. “To send representatives of the Committee to the Middle East to stress the fact that a substantial body of American public opinion shares our concern and interest in the area; and to report on the various ways in which this Committee might be most helpful.
5. “To arrange public exhibits, in connection with our churches, universities; and other cultural centers, of the arts and creative industries of the Middle East.
6. “To invite the participation of the many Americans of Near Eastern origin in our work.
7. “To aid, whenever possible, in the preservation and rebuilding of shrines, libraries, and cultural centers in the Middle East.
8. “To work toward the calling of a spiritual and cultural conference, in the Middle East, for the purpose of counteracting the old isolation with a plan for permanent cooperation between American and Middle Eastern peoples.”

While at the time of the JTA's reporting it was accurate in that no one identifying as Jewish was part of the AFME, the (eventually-controversial) Reform rabbi Elmer Berger joined its national council in 1952; before this, the AFME was associated, via some of its charter members' associations, with other Arabist/anti-Zionist organizations with notable Jewish membership such as the American Council for Judaism and the Committee for Justice and Peace in the Holy Land.

See also 

 American Board of Commissioners for Foreign Missions
 Confederation of Iranian Students

Further reading
 Hugh Wilford, 2013, "America's Great Game: The CIA's Secret Arabists and the Shaping of the Modern Middle East," New York, N.Y.:Basic Books, see , accessed 17 June 2015.

References

Middle Eastern studies in the United States
Palestinian solidarity movement